Perkins Stadium is a stadium in Whitewater, Wisconsin. Primarily used for American football, it is the home field of the University of Wisconsin–Whitewater "Warhawks". Opened in 1970 as Warhawks Stadium, the facility originally held 11,000 people. It was renamed Perkins Stadium on September 14, 1996, in honor of former football coach Forrest Perkins.

The stadium hosts the MACBDA Championships and the WSMA State Marching Band Championships. Drum Corps International held its annual Drum & Bugle Corps World Championships at the stadium in 1972 and 1973.

The stadium received new synthetic turf, bench areas, landscaping and other improvements, including upgrades to the entrance area and scoreboard, in 2008. With this upgrade the new seating capacity is now at 13,500, making it the largest stadium in Division III.

On October 3, 2015, a record crowd of 15,287 was recorded for a game. That mark was shattered on October 8, 2016, when the Warhawks defeated the University of Wisconsin-Oshkosh 17–14 in front of a crowd of 17,535 fans, then broken again on October 13, 2022, for a Friday night game between the same teams with 18,951 in attendance. That not only broke the previous Perkins Stadium record, but also broke the NCAA Division III record for attendance. On September 23, 2017, the NCAA record was broken by a St. Thomas vs. Saint John's contest that was hosted at Target Field in Minneapolis, Minnesota. However, the October 2022 game maintains the largest crowd for a Division III game played at a non-neutral site.

References

External links
Aerial View of Perkins Stadium

College football venues
American football venues in Wisconsin
Wisconsin–Whitewater Warhawks football
Whitewater, Wisconsin
Buildings and structures in Walworth County, Wisconsin
1970 establishments in Wisconsin
Sports venues completed in 1970
Sports in the Milwaukee metropolitan area